The Play-offs of the 1997 Fed Cup Asia/Oceania Zone Group II were the final stages of the Group II Zonal Competition involving teams from Asia and Oceania. Using the positions determined in their pools, the eight teams faced off to determine their overall placing in the 1997 Fed Cup Asia/Oceania Zone Group I. The top team advanced to World Group II Play-offs, and the bottom team were relegated down to the Asia/Oceania Zone Group II.

Draw

First round

Indonesia vs. Hong Kong

Chinese Taipei vs. China

New Zealand vs. Kazakhstan

India vs. Thailand

Repechage Round

Hong Kong vs. China

Second round

Indonesia vs. Chinese Taipei

New Zealand vs. Thailand

Final Placements

  advanced to the World Group II Play-offs, where they were drawn against . They lost 0–5, and as such were relegated back to Group I for the next year.

See also
Fed Cup structure

References

External links
 Fed Cup website

1997 Fed Cup Asia/Oceania Zone